HC Energie Karlovy Vary is a professional ice hockey team based in Karlovy Vary, Czech Republic. They play in the highest-level national league, the Czech Extraliga.

The club

The history of the ice hockey in Karlovy Vary dates back to the 1932, when a few enthusiasts established SK Slavia Karlovy Vary. The home arena of this club was a small lake nicknamed Little Versailles. In 1948, an artificial ice rink was built, which significantly improved the standards. Within a few years, the ice hockey team Karlovy Vary was competing on a national level. The club steadily remained in the first league (Přebor republiky) in the years 1951–52, 1952–53, 1953–54, 1954–55. The numbers of spectators coming to the games in those days were up to and over 10 000. In 1953 the team's name changed to 'Dynamo'. One of the greatest achievements of those days can be considered the games with HK Lokomotiv Moscow which ended 2:3 for Dynamo, or victory 8:5 against the Czechoslovakian National Team (which was training for the World Championships). Many key players were injured during the season 1954-55 and the club got relegated to the second league. However, as dominant as Dynamo was in the second league, they never managed to get back to the top league. The team was renamed back to Slavia in 1965. As harsh times came at the end of the 70s when the arena started to fall into disrepair and was not fit for purpose any more, the council decided to build two ice rinks. The construction of the first, training rink commenced shortly and was completed in 1975. The project to build the arena of national standards next to the training ground was never realized. The existing ice rink had the roof put on by the end of 80s. In 1990, changing rooms were built and further improvements were carried out such as new services, cooling of the surface, barriers with artificial glass, etc. Basically everything that was missing right from the start. A large financial burden and no interest of the local council caused that the club was relegated to the division group (note: 1) Extraliga ('Extra League'), 2) 1. liga ('First League'), 3) 2.liga ('Second League'), 4) krajské přebory ('Division'). All changed in 1991 with a new management and generous sponsor: firm Jan Becher. From the season 1993/1994, the team's name was changed to HC Slavia Becherovka Karlovy Vary (from season 1996/1997 HC Becherovka Karlovy Vary). The club reached the First League in 1995 and a couple of years later in 1997, HC Becherovka Karlovy Vary fought their way into the Extra League. They did not managed to defeat Opava in the playoffs, but with a stable position in the competition, the club bought the rights of HC Olomouc which was in financial difficulties. The club got a new sponsor in 2002, the Sokolovskou uhelnou a. s., and was renamed to HC Energie. In season 2007/2008, the team, led by coach Zdeňek Venera, fought their way into the finals, but lost in a 7-games battle to Prague's team Slavia.

The club's effort paid off next year under the coach Josef Paleček and captain Václav Skuhravy in repetition of last year's finals, HC Energie won 4:2 on games and celebrated their first Extraliga title. The best player of the playoffs that year was Lukáš Mensator. The Extraliga Finals of the 2008/2009 season was also the last game in the old arena in Dolní Kamenna. From the next season, the club moved into the newly built KV Arena.

Some of the icons of ice hockey in Karlovy Vary are Václav Šinágl, Lukáš Mensator and Tomáš Vokoun.

Energie's junior team joined the MHL, the KHL's junior league, for the 2012–13 season, but then left after the 2014–15 season.

In 2017, the team lost the main sponsor Sokolovská uhelná and played the season 2017/18 in the second highest league. The next year, however, the team returned to the Extraliga.

Honours

Domestic

Czech Extraliga
  Winners (1): 2008–09
  Runners-up (1): 2007–08

Czech 1. Liga
  Winners (2): 1996–97, 2017–18
  3rd place (1): 1995–96

Czech 2. Liga
  Winners (1): 1994–95

Pre-season
Tipsport Hockey Cup
  Runners-up (1): 2007

Players

Current roster
Source: hokejkv.czSource: eliteprospects.comAs of February 25, 2022.

References

External links

Official website 

Ice hockey teams in Czechoslovakia
Ice hockey teams in the Czech Republic
HC Karlovy Vary
Ice hockey clubs established in 1932
1932 establishments in Czechoslovakia